Claude Charles (1661–1747) was a French historical and decorative painter.

Charles was born at Nancy in 1661. He studied under Gérard, and became herald at arms and painter to Leopold, Duke of Lorraine. He painted numerous pictures for the churches of Nancy, and died in that city.

Paintings
st. Peter, Toul cathedral,
Nivard, Abbaye Saint-Pierre d'Hautvillers.

References

 

1661 births
1747 deaths
Artists from Nancy, France
17th-century French painters
French male painters
18th-century French painters
18th-century French male artists